The 2011 Pan American Cycling Championships took place in Medellín, Colombia on May 1–8, 2011.

Medal summary

Road

Men

Women

Men (under 23)

Track

Men

Women

Medal table

References

Americas
Americas
Cycling
Pan American Road and Track Championships
International cycle races hosted by Colombia